Grevillea subterlineata is a species of flowering plant in the family Proteaceae and is endemic to a restricted area in the southwest of Western Australia. It is an open shrub with linear leaves and clusters of pink-tinged, white flowers.

Description
Flowering occurs in August.

Taxonomy
Grevillea subterlineata was first formally described in 1993 by Robert Owen Makinson in Grevillea, Proteaceae: a taxonomic revision. The specific epithet (subterlineata) means "marked beneath by fine parallel lines".

Distirbution and habitat
This grevillea is only known from an area east of Gascoyne Junction in the Carnarvon, Gascoyne and Murchison bioregions of south-western Western Australia, where it grows in open shrubland and mulga woodland.

Conservation status
Grevillea subterlineata is classified as "Priority Three" by the Government of Western Australia Department of Biodiversity, Conservation and Attractions, meaning that it is poorly known and known from only a few locations but is not under imminent threat.

See also
 List of Grevillea species

References

subterlineata
Proteales of Australia
Eudicots of Western Australia
Taxa named by Robert Owen Makinson
Plants described in 1993